Anavilhanas National Park is a national park that encompasses a huge river archipelago in the Rio Negro in the state of Amazonas, Brazil. It is part of a World Heritage Site.

Location

The park is in the municipalities of Manaus and Novo Airão.
It is managed by the Chico Mendes Institute for Biodiversity Conservation.
The fluvial part of the park, 60% of the total, has more than 400 islands.
The park is bounded to the north and east by the Rio Negro Left Bank Environmental Protection Area, a  sustainable use conservation area created in 1995.
The fluvial section extends to the west shore of the Rio Negro, which is mainly protected by the Rio Negro Right Bank Environmental Protection Area and the Rio Negro Sustainable Development Reserve.

The park contains a variety of forest types and river and lake ecosystems.

Conservation
The park was originally created on 6 February 1981 as an integral protection unit covering .
It was reclassified from the strictly protected ecological station to the more open (but still protected) national park status by law nº 11.799 of 29 October 2008.

The park protects the environment of the Anavilhanas river archipelago in the Rio Negro, one of the largest in the world, and its forest formations.
It supports scientific research and enhances conservation of the Amazon biome through environmental education and sustainable tourism.
The park is open year round.
Protected species include margay (Leopardus wiedii), jaguar (Panthera onca), giant anteater (Myrmecophaga tridactyla), giant armadillo (Priodontes maximus), giant otter (Pteronura brasiliensis), Amazonian manatee (Trichechus inunguis), and Amazon river dolphin (Inia geoffrensis).

Jaú National Park was inscribed by UNESCO as a  World Heritage Site  in 2000.
It became part of the Central Amazon Ecological Corridor, established in 2002.
In 2003, the property was expanded by the addition of the Anavilhanas National Park, Amanã Sustainable Development Reserve, and Mamirauá Sustainable Development Reserve to form the Central Amazon Conservation Complex, a larger World Heritage Site.
The park became part of the Lower Rio Negro Mosaic, created in 2010.
The conservation unit is supported by the Amazon Region Protected Areas Program.

References

Sources

National parks of Brazil
Protected areas of Amazonas (Brazilian state)
Protected areas established in 1981
1981 establishments in Brazil
Ramsar sites in Brazil